Elisabeth of Poland may refer to:
Elisabeth of Greater Poland (1152–1209), married firstly ca. 1173 to Sobeslav II, Duke of Bohemia and secondly aft. January 1180 to Conrad of Landsberg, Margrave of Niederlausitz

 Elisabeth of Greater Poland (1263- 28 September 1304), married Henry V, Duke of Legnica
 Elisabeth Richeza of Poland (1 September 1286 – 18 October 1335) married Wenceslaus II of Bohemia
 Elisabeth of Poland (1305–1380) married Charles I of Hungary
 Elisabeth of Poland (1326–1361) married Bogislaw V, Duke of Pomerania
 Elizabeth of Kuyavia married Stephen II, Ban of Bosnia, mother of Elizabeth of Bosnia